Microsoft Liquid Motion was a product from Microsoft to create Java animations. It was based on technology acquired from Dimension-X. A beta was released in 1998, and version 1.0 was released soon thereafter to compete with Macromedia Flash. The product was eventually discontinued by Microsoft in 2000 due to lack of popularity. Since Liquid Motion created Java-based animations, they were cross-platform and browser-independent.

See also
Microsoft Vizact 2000
DirectAnimation
Microsoft Silverlight

References

External links
 More information

Liquid Motion
Year of introduction missing
Animation software
Microsoft Office-related software